Generalbezirk Lettland (General District Latvia) was one of the four administrative subdivisions of Reichskommissariat Ostland, the civilian occupation regime established by Nazi Germany for the administration of the Baltic States (Estonia, Latvia and Lithuania)  and the western part of the Byelorussian Soviet Socialist Republic.

Organization and Structure 
Generalbezirk Lettland was originally organized on 25 July 1941 on the territory of the then German-occupied Latvia, which had until then been under the military administration of the Wehrmacht's Army Group North. By 1 September 1941, in the wake of further German gains, it expanded to its full extent, reaching the former Estonian and Soviet borders. The capital of Generalbezirk Lettland was Riga.

Administrative divisions 

Generalbezirk Lettland had the following six subdivisions called Kreisgebiete (County Areas). The seat of administration is in parentheses.
Dünaburg (Daugavpils)
Libau (Liepāja)
Mitau (Jelgava)
Riga-Land (Riga-Rural)
Riga-Stadt (Riga-Urban)
Wolmar (Valmiera)

Civil and Police Leadership 
Civil administration was led by a Generalkommissar (General Commissioner) directly appointed by Adolf Hitler, and who reported to Ostland Reichskommissar Hinrich Lohse, headquartered in Riga. In addition, police and security matters were overseen by an SS and Police Leader (SSPF) directly appointed by Reichsführer-SS Heinrich Himmler, and who reported to the Higher SS and Police Leader (HSSPF) Ostland und Russland-Nord in Riga, SS-Gruppenführer Hans-Adolf Prützmann until 1 November 1941, and SS-Obergruppenführer Friedrich Jeckeln after that date.

Generalkommissar: Otto-Heinrich Drechsler (25 July 1941 – 14 September 1944).
SS and Police Leader: SS-Brigadeführer Walther Schröder (4 August 1941 – 19 October 1944.

Holocaust 

Following the German invasion in June 1941, the death squads of Einsatzgruppe A and their Latvian collaborators, including the Arajs Kommando, immediately began the systematic murder of Latvian Jews. It is estimated that approximately 70,000, or about three-quarters of the pre-war population, were killed. In addition, thousands of Romani people and ethnic Latvians perished in the slaughter. Generalbezirk Lettland was the site of the Rumbula massacre, one of the most notorious mass executions in the eastern occupied territories.

Dissolution 
On 14 September 1944, the Red Army launched its Riga offensive and Generalkommissar Drechsler departed for Lübeck in Germany. Riga fell on 13 October and Generalbezirk Lettland effectively ceased to exist. Administration of those parts of Latvia still under German occupation reverted to military administration under Army Group North. Some German forces were trapped in the Courland pocket and continued armed resistance until finally surrendering on 10 May 1945.

See also 
German occupation of Latvia during World War II
The Holocaust in Latvia

References

Generalbezirk Lettland
Latvia in World War II
Reichskommissariat Ostland
States and territories disestablished in 1944
States and territories established in 1941
World War II occupied territories